The 2002 Holy Cross Crusaders football team was an American football team that represented the College of the Holy Cross during the 2002 NCAA Division I-AA football season. Holy Cross finished second-to-last in the Patriot League. 

In their seventh year under head coach Dan Allen, the Crusaders compiled a 4–8 record. David Dugan, Brian Hall, Nick Soivillien and Ross Sullivan were the team captains.

The Crusaders were outscored 344 to 292. Their 2–5 conference record placed seventh in the eight-team Patriot League standings. 

Holy Cross began the year unranked, but after two wins to start the season -- including a road win over Army, a Division I-A team -- the Crusaders entered the national Division I-AA top 25. They were ranked No. 25 in the poll released September 10, and No. 23 the following week. The loss to Harvard dropped them out of the top 25, and Holy Cross remained unranked for the rest of 2002.

Holy Cross played its home games at Fitton Field on the college campus in Worcester, Massachusetts.

Schedule

References

Holy Cross
Holy Cross Crusaders football seasons
Holy Cross Crusaders football